This article contains a list of all matches played during the 2019 Super Rugby regular season.

Round 1

Round 2

Round 3

Round 4

Round 5

Note*: The match was cancelled and called a draw due to 2019 Christchurch Mosque Shootings

Round 6

Round 7

Round 8

Round 9

Round 10

Round 11

Round 12

Round 13

Round 14

Round 15

Round 16

Round 17

Round 18

See also

 2019 Super Rugby season

References

2019 Super Rugby season
Super Rugby lists